Major facilitator superfamily domain containing 3 (MFSD3) is a protein belonging to the MFS Pfam clan. It is an Atypical solute carrier located to the neuronal plasma membrane.

HGNC:25157

TCDB: 2.A.1.25.4

MFSD3 belongs to AMTF15.

References 

Solute carrier family